Jean-David Bernard (born 27 July 1977 in Melun) is a French rower.

References

External links 
 
 

1977 births
Living people
French male rowers
Sportspeople from Melun
Olympic rowers of France
Rowers at the 2004 Summer Olympics
World Rowing Championships medalists for France
20th-century French people
21st-century French people